James Patrick Morgan, known as Jimmy, but nicknamed "Nitro" (December 16, 1948 - February 8, 1981) was an American bobsledder who competed from the mid-1970s to the early 1980s. His death during the 1981 FIBT World Championships in Cortina d'Ampezzo, Italy at the bobsleigh track used for the 1956 Winter Olympics coupled with the death of a stuntman involved in the production of the 1981 film For Your Eyes Only would lead to the shortening of the Cortina d'Ampezzo track to its current configuration.

A native of Saranac Lake, New York, Morgan competed in the 1976 Winter Olympics in Innsbruck, finishing 14th in the two-man event and 15th in the four-man event.

Morgan's younger brother, John, was also a bobsledder who has served as a television color commentator for the sport of bobsled since 1981. John was in fact calling the competition with ABC Sports' Bill Flemming at the 1981 World Championships that took James' life.

References

1975 picture of Morgan driving two-man bobsleigh (Location not given)
1976 bobsleigh two-man results
1976 bobsleigh four-man results
Bunksplace.com article on the Morgan death during the 1981 FIBT World Championships in Cortina d'Ampezzo, Italy
For Your Eyes Only production notes featuring the Cortina track
Hot Runnings link on bunksplace.com memorializing Morgan
Sports-reference.com profile.

1948 births
1981 deaths
American male bobsledders
Bobsledders at the 1976 Winter Olympics
Bobsledders who died while racing
Olympic bobsledders of the United States
Sportspeople from New York (state)
Sport deaths in Italy
People from Saranac Lake, New York
Filmed deaths in sports